James F. Chappell (1891–1964) was an American astronomer and photographer.

He worked at the Lick Observatory where he performed
photography of the Moon. He is noted for the development of special photographic techniques for use in astronomy.

The crater Chappell on the Moon is named after him.

References
 

1891 births
1964 deaths
American astronomers
20th-century American photographers